The White Haired Witch of Lunar Kingdom is a 2014 Chinese wuxia-fantasy film based on the best-selected novel Romance of the White-Haired Maiden written by Liang Yusheng. Directed by Jacob Cheung and co-produced by Bona Film Group and Huang Jianxin with the creative consultant led by Tsui Hark, the film stars Fan Bingbing, Huang Xiaoming, Vincent Zhao and others among the supporting cast. Originally scheduled for release on 25 April 2014, the film was moved to 1 August 2014, then moved a day earlier to 31 July 2014.

Cast
 Fan Bingbing as Lian Nishang
 Huang Xiaoming as Zhuo Yihang
 Vincent Zhao as Jin Duyi
 Wang Xuebing as Murong Chong
 Ni Dahong as Wei Zhongxian
 Tong Yao as Ke Pingting
 Li Xinru as Tie Shanhu
 Cecilia Yip as Ling Yunfeng
 Yan Yikuan as Huangtaiji

Production
The White Haired Witch of Lunar Kingdom was produced at a budget of 100 million yuan. Shooting started in November 2012 and ended in March 2013. During filming, Huang Xiaoming had a three-metre fall after a wire accident on the set and he fractured two toes on his left foot. He had to sit in a wheelchair for weeks, but resumed filming even though he had yet to fully recover. On 2 April 2013, Huang and Fan Bingbing attended a press conference in Beijing to talk about their experiences in filming White Haired Witch.

Reception

Box office
The film grossed US$61,900,000 in mainland China and a total of  internationally.

Critical response
The film received negative reviews from audiences. The review aggregator Rotten Tomatoes reports a 0 approval rating from critics, with an average score of 4.3/10, based on 6 reviews. The Hollywood Reporter said, "it's a shame that Cheung's first film in seven years is eventually weighed down by this rushed, uneven sprawl of a story credited to five screenwriters, each of whom possibly bringing their own references (ranging from political-parable historical dramas like last year's Life of Ming, to the contemporary dramas like Infernal Affairs) and their perspective in how to make The White Haired Witch connect with a new generation of viewers. Their attempt in reinventing this tale sits uncomfortably with the one central element that couldn't be moved — that is, the troubled (and sloppily presented) romance involving the title character."

On Chinese movie review site Douban, the film has a rating of 3.8/10, based on 51590 viewers. On Mtime.com, it has a score of 5.5 out of 10, based on 13137 viewers.

References

External links
 

2014 films
Wuxia films
Martial arts fantasy films
Works based on Baifa Monü Zhuan
Films based on Chinese novels
Chinese romantic fantasy films
2014 fantasy films
Chinese 3D films
2014 3D films
Films directed by Jacob Cheung
Films based on Baifa Monü Zhuan
Polybona Films films